Mezquital is one of the 39 municipalities of Durango, in north-western Mexico. The municipal seat lies at San Francisco del Mezquital. The municipality covers an area of 7,196.5 km².

As of 2010, the municipality had a total population of 33,396, up from 30,069 as of 2005. 

The municipality had 1,325 localities, the largest of which (with 2010 population in parentheses) was: San Francisco del Mezquital (1,742), classified as urban.

References

Municipalities of Durango